The 1921 season was the second year of competitive football in the Baltic country as an independent nation.

Matches
The team played their first matches at home turf, but playing in front of the home crowd was not enough to win. Neither did they manage to score a goal.

Estonia vs Sweden
In the first game, against Sweden, the team managed a goal-less draw. The visitors had a penalty in closing minutes of the first half, but failed to convert it as the taker hit the crossbar. Follow-up to the match, Swedish newspaper Idrottsbladet joked that the match ball had to be chosen from two balls – one quadrangular and one octangular. The latter one was chosen as more rounder one.

Estonia vs Finland
The second game of the year was also the second time the Estonians played against their northern neighbours. Heavy waterfall turned the pitch into a quagmire, but that didn't stop Finns to overcome the newcomers. Verner Eklöf did not repeat what Swedes did a month ago and converted the penalty in the second half, thus becoming the first player to score from the spot against Estonia. As Estonia's previous captain Heinrich Paal was not present, Otto Silber took over the armband. For debutant Eduard Jõepere, this was ultimately his only appearance for the blueshirts.

Players
There 12 players appeared for the national team in 1921:

 Eduard Ellman-Eelma
 Ernst Joll
 Eduard Jõepere

 Harald Kaarman
 Arnold Kuulman
 August Lass

 Voldemar Luik
 Heinrich Paal
 Otto Silber

 Vladimir Tell
 Georg Vain
 Oskar Üpraus

Debutants
 #14–#18: Eduard Ellman-Eelma, Harald Kaarman, August Lass, Voldemar Luik and Georg Vain in the match against Sweden.
 #19: Eduard Jõepere in the match against Finland.

References

1921
1921 national football team results
National